Martín Adrián Satriano Costa (born 20 February 2001) is a Uruguayan professional footballer who plays as a forward for  club Empoli, on loan from Inter Milan. He also represents the Uruguay national team.

Club career
Satriano is a former youth academy player of Nacional. On 31 January 2020, Serie A club Inter Milan signed him on a contract  until June 2024. He made his professional debut on 21 August 2021, coming on as a 77th-minute substitute for Hakan Çalhanoğlu in a 4–0 league win against Genoa.

On 17 January 2022, he moved on loan to Ligue 1 club Brest until the end of the season. He scored his first two professional goals in a 5–1 league win over Troyes on 13 February.

On 4 July 2022, Satriano moved on loan to Empoli.

International career
On 7 January 2022, Satriano was named in Uruguay's 50-man preliminary squad for FIFA World Cup qualifying matches against Paraguay and Venezuela. He made his debut on 27 September 2022 in a 2–0 friendly win against Canada. On 21 October 2022, he was named in Uruguay's 55-man preliminary squad for the 2022 FIFA World Cup.

Personal life
Satriano is the son of former footballer Gerardo Satriano. He is of Italian descent and was eligible to represent Italy in international football until he turned down the offer.

Career statistics

Club

International

References

External links
 
 

2001 births
Living people
Footballers from Montevideo
Association football forwards
Uruguayan footballers
Uruguayan people of Italian descent
Uruguay international footballers
Serie A players
Ligue 1 players
Inter Milan players
Stade Brestois 29 players
Empoli F.C. players
Uruguayan expatriate footballers
Uruguayan expatriate sportspeople in Italy
Uruguayan expatriate sportspeople in France
Expatriate footballers in Italy
Expatriate footballers in France